Markéta Sluková (born 28 June 1988) is a Czech beach volleyball player.

She competed on the FIVB Beach Volleyball World Tour and was named the FIVB World Tour Top Rookie in 2010. In addition to being consistently ranked among the top fifteen teams in the world her biggest achievements are: 5th place at the 2012 Summer Olympics in London (with Kristýna Kolocová), 3 gold FIVB medals (Prague Open 2014, Berlin Grand Slam 2014, Antalya Open 2015) and 1 bronze FIVB medal (Gstaad Grand Slam 2014). From August 2015 until 2021 she played with Barbora Hermannová and were coached by Simon Nausch. Whilst being qualified the team had to withdraw from the Olympic games in Tokyo as Slukova was tested positive for COVID-19 just two days before the start of the competition.

Personal life
On 26 December 2021, Sluková Nausch posted on her Instagram that she was excited to be expecting a baby with her coach Simon Nausch.

Gallery

References

External links
 

1988 births
Czech beach volleyball players
Living people
Beach volleyball players at the 2012 Summer Olympics
Beach volleyball players at the 2016 Summer Olympics
Olympic beach volleyball players of the Czech Republic
Women's beach volleyball players
Sportspeople from Prague